William Joseph Parnell MacMillan (March 24, 1881 – December 7, 1957) was a physician and Prince Edward Island politician.

Life and career
Born in Clermont, MacMillan was a graduate of Prince of Wales College and the McGill University Faculty of Medicine.

After running a medical practice for several years, MacMillan entered politics in 1923 winning a seat in the provincial legislative assembly as a Conservative. In 1932 he became the province's first minister of health and education.  As minister he rebuilt Prince of Wales College and the Provincial Mental Hospital which had both been destroyed by fire. He also secured a Carnegie Foundation endowment that enabled the government to establish a provincial library system.

When Premier James D. Stewart became ill, MacMillan served as acting premier and then became the 18th premier of Prince Edward Island when Stewart died in 1933. MacMillan's government implemented relief programs and increasing government spending to help dampen the impact of the Great Depression. Nevertheless, his government was swept from power in the 1935 election which saw the Liberals capture every seat in the legislature. He returned to the legislature in 1939 and remained leader of the Conservative Party until the late 1940s and a member of the legislature until he lost his seat in the 1955 election.

MacMillan was named the province's lieutenant governor on November 22, 1957 but died before being sworn in.

1881 births
1957 deaths
People from Prince County, Prince Edward Island
Premiers of Prince Edward Island
Progressive Conservative Party of Prince Edward Island MLAs
Progressive Conservative Party of Prince Edward Island leaders
Prince of Wales College alumni
McGill University Faculty of Medicine alumni